Cetacean bycatch (or cetacean by-catch) is the incidental capture of non-target cetacean species such as dolphins, porpoises, and whales by fisheries. Bycatch can be caused by entanglement in fishing nets and lines, or direct capture by hooks or in trawl nets.

Cetacean bycatch is increasing in intensity and frequency. This is a trend that is likely to continue because of increasing human population growth and demand for marine food sources, as well as industrialization of fisheries which are expanding into new areas. These fisheries come into direct and indirect contact with cetaceans. An example of direct contact is the physical contact of cetaceans with fishing nets. Indirect contact is through marine trophic pathways where fisheries are severely reducing fish stocks that cetaceans rely on for food. In some fisheries, cetaceans are captured as bycatch but then retained because of their value as food or bait. In this fashion, cetaceans can become a target of fisheries.

Bycatch trends 

Generally cetacean bycatch is on the increase. Most of the world’s cetacean bycatch occurs in gillnet fisheries. The mean annual bycatch in the U.S. alone from 1990–1999 was 6,215 marine mammals, with dolphins and porpoises being the primary cetaceans caught in gillnets. A study by Read et al. estimated global bycatch through observation of U.S. fisheries and came to the conclusion that an annual estimate of 653,365 marine mammals, comprising 307,753 cetaceans and 345,611 pinnipeds were caught from 1990–1994.

While gillweed nets are a principal concern, other types of nets also pose a problem: trawl nets, purse seines, beach seines, longline gear, and driftnets. Driftnets are known for high rates of bycatch and they affect all cetaceans and other marine species. They are fatal for small toothed whales (Odontocetes) and sperm whales, as well as other marine mammals and fish such as sharks, sea birds and sea turtles. Many fisheries routinely use driftnets exceeding the EU size limit of 2.5 km/boat. This illegal drift-netting is a major issue, especially in important feeding and breeding grounds for cetaceans.

However, the tuna industry has achieved successes in reversing cetacean bycatch trends. International recognition of the problem of cetacean bycatch in tuna fishing led to the Agreement on the International Dolphin Conservation Program in 1999 and overall there has been a dramatic reduction in death rates. In particular, dolphin bycatch in tuna fishing in the East Tropical Pacific has dropped from 500,000 per year in 1970 to 100,000 per year in 1990 to 3,000 per year in 1999 to 1,000 per year in 2006.

A shark culling program in Queensland, which has killed roughly 50,000 sharks since 1962, has also killed thousands of dolphins as bycatch. "Shark control" programs in both Queensland and New South Wales use shark nets and drum lines, which entangle and kill dolphins. Queensland's "shark control" program has killed more than 1,000 dolphins in recent years, and at least 32 dolphins have been killed in Queensland since 2014. A shark culling program in KwaZulu-Natal has killed at least 2,310 dolphins.

Cetaceans at risk 
Bycatch is recognized as a primary threat to all cetaceans. The following cetaceans are at high risk for entanglement in gillnets:

Atlantic humpback dolphins 
The Atlantic humpback dolphin (Sousa teuszii) is endemic to West Africa. Several stocks have been identified with numbers ranging from tens to a few hundred. Abundance estimates are lacking. Gaps in the species range and hence distribution is evident. Bycatch is only documented in a few West African countries. Surveys and evaluations need to be conducted to determine the presence/ absence of humpback dolphins in their historical range. Conservation measures need to be implemented to save this species. Because many people live off the sea, it is not feasible to have complete gillnet closures. Some areas may be designated as off-limits to gillnet fisheries. Eco-tourism may be implemented successfully because of high species diversity.

Baleen whales 

Baleen whales, Mysticeti, are often taken in gill-nets and in fisheries that use vertical lines to mark traps and pots. Large cetaceans such as humpback and right whales may carry off gear after entanglement. This explains the large scars borne by whales along the U.S. Atlantic coast. Analyses show that 50-70% of Gulf of Maine humpback whales, Megaptera novaeangliae, and North Atlantic right whale, Eubalaena glacialis, have been entangled at least once in their lifetime. The North Atlantic right whale is one of the most endangered large cetaceans and only 300-350 individuals remain. Minke whales, Balaenoptera acutorostrata, are also at risk.

Burmeister’s porpoises 
The Burmeister's porpoise (Phocoena spinipinnis) is one of three cetaceans that are most often bycaught in Peru and Chile. Several thousand porpoises are caught each year in Peru alone.  Bycatch is a frequent occurrence for this species because of the inability to detect them in the water. Surveys have shown that bycatch remains a concern in that area today and it is unknown whether or not the population is declining. Data, conservation measures and awareness are lacking. These porpoises are cryptic making surveying a challenge. It is also difficult to estimate bycatch because the sale of porpoise meat is no longer available at markets.

Commerson’s dolphins 

The expanding trawl fisheries devastated the Commerson's dolphin (Cephalorhynchus commersonii) populations in Patagonia. Trawl fisheries greatly expanded for twenty years until they crashed in 1997. Pelagic squid fisheries took over which use pelagic trawls that are harmful to dusky, short-beaked common dolphins, and Commerson’s dolphins. There are approximately 21,000 Commerson’s dolphins remaining today. Two stocks have been identified in the population but genetic information and bycatch levels are unknown. With anchovy fisheries expanding, it is imperative to assess the Commerson’s dolphin population before these fisheries grow. The seasonal operation of in-shore gillnet fisheries are known to involve bycatch of cetaceans. Presently, there are no known estimates of gillnet bycatch. The bycatch problem in Argentina is political in nature. Improvements in fishing technology, awareness, and a large scale survey of Commerson’s dolphin populations and the impact of bycatch is essential.

La Plata dolphins 
The La Plata or Franciscana dolphin (Pontoporia blainvillei) is the most threatened small cetacean in the southwest Atlantic Ocean due to bycatch. They are only found in the coastal waters of Argentina, Brazil, and Uruguay. This species has been divided into four ranges (FMU’s: Franciscana Management Units) for management and conservation purposes. These populations are genetically different. Mortality rates are 1.6% for FMU 4 and 3.3% for FMU 3 but it is unknown whether these estimates are accurate. Aerial surveys have proven inconclusive so far as to the population numbers of franciscanas. To rectify this situation, more surveys are needed as well as political commitment, awareness campaigns and bycatch mitigation techniques.

Harbour porpoises 
There is substantial incidental catches in fishing operations. Often, the harbour porpoise (Phocoena phocoena) is killed by incidental by-catch (10, 11, 12). Gillnets pose a serious threat to the harbour porpoise as they are extremely susceptible to entanglement. A study by Caswell et al. in the western North Atlantic combined the mean annual rate of increase of the harbour porpoise with the uncertainty of incidental mortality and population size. It was found that the incidental mortality exceeds critical values and therefore by-catch is a significant threat to the harbour porpoise. Harbour porpoises become entangled in nets due to their inability to detect the nets before collision. In 2001, 80 harbour porpoises were killed in salmon gillnet fisheries in British Columbia, Canada.

Hector's and Maui's dolphins 

In New Zealand, these dolphins have a high rate of entanglement. Hector's dolphin  (Cephalorhynchus hectori) is endemic to the coastal waters New Zealand and there are about 7,400 in abundance. A small population of Hector’s dolphins is isolated on the west coast of the island and have been declared a subspecies called Maui's dolphin. Maui's dolphins (Cephalofhynchus hectori maui) are often caught in set nets and pair trawlers resulting in less than 100 left in the wild.  For protection, a section of the dolphin’s range on the west coast has been closed to gillnet fisheries.

Indo-Pacific humpback and bottlenose dolphins 
Drift and bottom-set gillnets are the biggest conservation threat to these dolphins in the Indian Ocean. There have only been assessments in some areas, such as Zanzibar. Hunting, until 1996, reduced the population and contributed to its decline. Now hunting has been replaced with eco-tourism. It was estimated in 2001 that there are 161 bottlenose dolphins (Tursiops aduncus) and 71 Indo-Pacific humpback dolphin (Sousa chinensis) that are left based on photo-identification mark-recapture techniques. A study on bycatch revealed over 160 incidences of bycatch since 2000. Approximately 30% of bycatch is in drift and bottom-set gillnets. Mortality is about 8% and 5.6% for bottlenose and humpback dolphins respectively . The mitigation of bycatch is imperative for these species and eco-tourism.

Irrawaddy dolphins 
Based on a survey in 2001, fewer than 70 Irrawaddy dolphins (Orcaella brevirostris) left in the upper region of the Malampaya Sound in the Philippines and 69 individuals in the Mekong River. They have been severely impacted by lift nets, and crab gear and they are critically endangered. It is estimated that mortality from bycatch may be greater than 4.5% in Malampaya Sound and 5.8% in the Mekong River. The population is declining dramatically. Current bycatch levels are unsustainable and bycatch reduction measures as well as long-term systematic monitoring are urgently required. The elimination of gillnets from areas of high use is needed and economic incentives need to be provided to the local people.

Spinner and Fraser’s dolphins 

In the Philippines, tuna driftnet fisheries have a substantial impact on the populations. One tuna fishery alone kills 400 spinner dolphin (Stenella longirostris) and Fraser's dolphins (Lagenodelphis hosei) each year. Round-haul nets are an even greater concern with a bycatch of up to 3000 dolphins per year. Dolphins that are bycaught often end up as shark bait for longline fisheries. There is not enough data to conclude total bycatch for the Philippines. Initial assessment indicates that bycatch is not sustainable. Monitoring of dolphin populations and fisheries is urgently needed.

Yangtze River dolphins and finless porpoises 

The Yangtze River or Baiji dolphin (Lipotes vexillifer) is the most endangered cetacean and is only found in the Yangtze River, China. A survey conducted in 1997 found only thirteen dolphins. The Yangtze River finless porpoise (Neophocaena phocaenoides asiaeorientalis) also lives in the Yangtze River. Abundance has declined and there are fewer than 2000 dolphins left. This may be due, in part, to the construction of the Three Gorges Dam which covers a significant amount of the dolphin’s habitat. Both species are often subject to entanglement in gillnets.

Vaquita 
The vaquita (Phocoena sinus) is highly endangered and is endemic to the upper Gulf of California, Mexico. They are killed in both gillnets and trawl nets from commercial and artisanal fishing. As of 2004 there are less than 100 vaquitas left in the Gulf of California.

Mitigating bycatch

Acoustic deterrent devices 
The use of acoustic alarms to mitigate by-catch and also to protect aquaculture sites has been proposed but has advantages and risks associated with the alarms. Acoustic deterrent devices, or pingers, have reduced the number of cetaceans caught in gill nets. Harbour porpoises have been effectively excluded from bottom-set gill nets during many experiments for instance in the Gulf of Maine, along the Olympic Peninsula, in the Bay of Fundy, and in the North Sea. All of these studies show up to a 90% decrease in harbour porpoise bycatch. Pingers work because they produce a sound that is aversive (20; 15).  There has been a recent re-evaluation of the potential of pingers and their use in other fisheries due to their growing success.
An experiment on the California drift gill net fishery demonstrated how acoustic pingers reduce marine mammal bycatch. It was shown that bycatch was significantly reduced for common dolphins and sea lions. Bycatch rates were also lower for other cetacean species like the Northern right whale dolphin, Pacific white-sided dolphin, Risso’s dolphin and Dall's porpoise. It is agreed upon that the more pingers on a net, the less bycatch. There was a 12-fold decrease in common dolphin entanglement using a net with 40 pingers.
However, the widespread use of pingers along coastlines effectively excludes cetaceans such as porpoises from prime habitat and resources. Cetaceans which are extremely sensitive to noise are effectively being driven from their preferred coastal habitats by the use of acoustic devices. In poorer quality habitat, harbour porpoises are subjected to increased competition for resources. This situation is recognized as range contraction which can be a result of climate change, anthropogenic activity, or population decline. Large scale range contractions are considered indicative of impending extinction. A similar form of deterrent is noise pollution originating from vessel traffic.

Barium sulfate 
A promising gillnet that is effective in reducing bycatch for harbor porpoises contains barium sulfate.  These nets are detected at a greater distance than conventional nets because the barium sulfate reflects the echolocation signal, and also renders the nets more visible.  Barium sulfate makes the nets stiffer if it is added at high concentration. All three factors: echo reflectivity, stiffness, and visibility may be important in reducing bycatch. Fish takes in the Bay of Fundy were normal, except for haddock takes, which were down by 3-5%.   The advantage of this approach is that it is passive and thus does not require batteries, and there is no “dinner bell" effect. The potential advantage of these nets is greatest in the artisanal fishery. NOAA would like further testing to verify the effectiveness of the nets.

Fishing regulations and management 
Management and regulation are lacking in many fisheries today. Management measures are urgently needed to monitor fisheries (and illegal fisheries) to protect cetaceans. Efforts to document bycatch should focus on gill-net fisheries because cetaceans are more likely to be caught in gill-nets. Conservation efforts should be directed to areas where marine mammal bycatch is high but where no infrastructure exists to assess the impact. There is a lack of reporting on a global scale of cetacean bycatch.

In the U.S. the Marine Mammal Protection Act prohibits the use and sale of marine mammals captured by fisheries. Similar legislation prohibits the use and sale of marine mammals in other countries. A marine mammal mortality monitoring program for commercial fisheries occurs in the U.S. where “Take Reduction Teams" observe the extent of bycatch and then formulate strategies to reduce bycatch and Take Reduction Plans are put into place.

Temporary closure 
Temporary closure of fisheries during the short period of the year when cetaceans are migrating through the area would decrease bycatch significantly.

Observers on boat 
Observers are on fishing vessels spotting cetaceans in the water so that they can be avoided.

In the U.S. 
Some programs like Earth Island Institute’s Dolphin Safe Label certification claim to require certification from onboard observers. However, the only fishery in the world where independent scientific observers certify whether or not a dolphin has been harmed is the Eastern Tropical Pacific, home to the AIDCP Treaty program. For all other tuna fisheries of the world, the efficacy of onboard observer certification has come under increasing scrutiny as such programs have proven indefensible or unmanageable:

In an interview with Radio Australia last year, Mark Palmer of EII confirmed that it is mostly the case that EII monitors do not go on board of the vessels, and their organization does not have the kind of resources to put observers on the “many thousands" of ships that are out there catching tuna.

Additionally, environmental groups have criticized Earth Island Institute’s support of U.S. policies that do not require independent, on-board observation and instead only rely on self-certification by fishing captains, and that even where they may at some point in the future require independent observers, the lack of uniformity in tracing and verifying certifications in different countries means non-certified products can become certified if they are simply taken to the right port.

Other ways of mitigating bycatch 
Implement gear technology (changes in fishing gear and practices) documented to mitigate cetacean bycatch
Buy tuna and other seafood that has a dolphin safe label.
Buy Sustainable seafood. To find out which seafood is produced sustainably (i.e. using cetacean friendly gear), refer to World Wildlife Fund Global to access worldwide sustainable seafood guides
Support sustainable seafood companies and restaurants
Raise international awareness to assess, monitor and mitigate bycatch problems
Create legislation on responsible fishing practices.
Develop and promote industry adoption of "Best Practice Guidelines" for fishing operations

References

General references

 Alverson, DL, Freeburg, MH, Murawski, SA and JG Pope (1994). A global assessment of fisheries bycatch and discards. Fisheries Technical Paper. Food and Agriculture Organization, Rome. 339 pp.
Animal Freedom (2008) Cetacean Bycatch
Barlow, J & Cameron, GA (2003). Field experiments show that acoustic pingers reduce marine mammal bycatch in the Californian drift gill net fishery. Marine Mammal Science. 19: 265-283.
 Boughton, DA, Fish, H, Pipal, K, Goin, J, Watson, F, Casagrande, J, and M Stoecker (2005). Contraction of the southern range limit for anadromous Oncorhynchus mykiss. NOAA Technical Memorandum NMFS. NOAA-TM-NMFS-SWFSC-380. U.S. Department of Commerce.
 Caswell, H, Brault, S, Read, AJ, and TD Smith (1998). Harbour porpoise and fisheries: an uncertain analysis of incidental mortality. Ecological Applications. 8(4): 1226–1238.
 Culik, BM, Koschinski, S, Tregenza, N, and GM Ellis (2001). Reactions of harbour porpoises Phocoena phocoena and herring Clupea harengus to acoustic alarms. Marine Ecology Progress Series. 211: 155-260.
 Demaster, DJ, Fowler, CW, Perry, SL, and ME Richlen (2001). Predation and competition: the impact of fisheries on marine mammal populations over the next one hundred years. Journal of Mammalogy. 82: 641-651.
 Fishing Technology Service (2008) Managing bycatch and reducing discards: Taking it to the next level
 Gearin, PJ, Gosho, ME, Laake, JL, Cooke, L, DeLong, R, and KM Hughes (2000). Experimental testing of acoustic alarms (pingers) to reduce bycatch of harbor porpoise, Phocoena phocoena, in the state of Washington. Journal of Cetacean Research and Management. 2:1-9.
 Hammond, PS, Berggren, P, Benke, H, Borchers, DL, Collet, A, Heide-Jorgensen, MP, Heimlich, S, Hiby, AR, Leopold, MF, and N Oien (2002). Abundance of harbour porpoise and other cetaceans in the North Sea and adjacent waters. Journal of Applied Ecology. 39: 361-376.
 Jefferson, TA and Curry, BE (1994). A global review of porpoise (Cetacea: Phocoenidae) mortality in gill nets. Biological Conservation. 67(2): 167-183.
 Kastelein, RA, Au, WWL, and de Haan, D (1999). Detection distances of bottom-set gillnets by harbour porpoises (Phocoena phocoena) and bottlenose dolphins (Tursiops truncates). Marine Environmental Research. 49(4): 359-375.
 Knowlton, AR et al. (2003). Analysis of scarring on North Atlantic right whales (Eubalaena glacialis): monitoring rates of entanglement interaction. Final report. Northeast Fisheries Science Center, Woods Hole, Massachusetts.
 Kraus, S, Read, AJ, Solow, A, Baldwin, K, Spradlin, T, Anderson, E, and J Williamson (1997). Acoustic alarms reduce porpoise mortality. Nature. 388:525.
 Larsen, F (1997). Effekten af akustiske alarmer pa bifangst as marsvin i garn. Report number 44-97 (unpublished). Available from the Danish Institute for Fisheries Research, Jaegersborgvei 64-66, DK- 2800 kg. Lyngby, Denmark.
 Miragliuolo, A, Mussi, B, and G Bearzi (2002). Observations of driftnetting off the island of Ischia, Italy, with indirect evidence of dolphin bycatch. European Cetacean Research. 4pp.
 Monterey Bay Aquarium (2013) Seafood Watch 
 Mooney, TA, Nachtigall, P and Au, WWL, (2004). "Target strength of a nylon monofilament and an acoustically enhanced gillnet: predictions of biosonar detection ranges." Aquat. Mamm., 30: 220-26.
 Mooney, TA, Au, WWL, Nachtigall, P, and Trippel, EA (2007). "Acoustic and stiffness properties of gillnets as they relate to marine mammal bycatch." ICES J. Mar. Sci., 64: 1324–32.
 Murray, KT, Read, AJ, and AR Solow. 2000. The use of time/area closures to reduce bycatches of harbour porpoises: lessons from the Gulf of Maine sink gillnet fishery. Journal of Cetacean Research and Management. 2(2): 135-141.
 Read, AJ, Drinker, P, and S Northridge (2006). Bycatch of marine mammals in the U.S. and Global Fisheries. Conservation Biology. 20(1): 163-169.
 Reeves, RR, Hofman, RJ, Silber, GK, and D Wilkinson (1996). Acoustic deterrence of harmful marine mammal-fishery interactions. Proceedings of a workshop held in Seattle, Washington, 20–22 March 1996. U.S. Department of Commerce, NOAA Technical Memorandum, NMFS-OPR-10 (unpublished). 70 pp. Available from the NMFS Office of Protected Resources, 1335 East/ West Highway, Silver Springs, MD. 20910, USA.
 Reeves, RR, Berggren, P, Crespo, EA, Gales, N, Northridge, SP, Sciara, GND, Perrin, WF, Read, AJ, Rogan, E, Smith, BD, and KV Waerebeek (2005). Global priorities for reduction of cetacean bycatch. WWF document. 27 pp.
 Silvani, L, Gazo, JM, and A Aguilar (1999). Spanish driftnet fishing and incidental catches in the western Mediterranean. Biological Conservation. 90: 79-85.
 Trippel, EA, Strong, MB, Terhune, JM, and JD Conway (1999).  "Mitigation of harbour porpoise (Phocoena phocoena) by-catch in the gillnet fishery in the lower Bay of Fundy." Canadian Journal of Fisheries and Aquatic Science, 56: 113-123.
 Trippel, EA, Holy, NL, and Shepperd, TD, (2008). "Barium sulphate modified fishing gear as a mitigative measure for cetacean incidental mortalities." J. Cetacean Res. Manage., 10(3):235–246.
 World Wildlife Fund Global (2013).  Sustainable Seafood: Consumer Guides

Further reading 

 Baird, RW and Guenther, TJ (1995). Account of harbour porpoise (Phocoena phocoena) strandings and bycatches along the coast of British Columbia. Reports of the International Whaling Commission Special Issue. 16: 159-168.
 Cox, TM, Read, AJ, Swanner, D, Urian, K and D Waples. 2004. Behavioural responses of bottlenose dolphins, Tursiops truncatus, to gillnets and acoustic alarms. Biological Conservation. 115: 203-212.
 Cox, TM, Read, AJ, Solow, A and N Tregenza. 2001. Will harbour porpoises (Phocoea phocoena) habituate to pingers? Journal of cetacean Research and Management. 3: 81-86.
 Donovan, GP. 1994. Developments on issues relating to the incidental catches of cetaceans since 1992 and the UNCED conference. Report of the IWC (Special Issue). 15: 609-613.
 Guenther, TJ et al. (1993). Cetacean strandings and entanglement in fishing gear on the west coast of Canada during 1992. IWC Document SC/45/O 4. 1-7 pp.
 Guenther (1995) Guenther, TJ et al. (1995). Strandings and fishing gear entanglements of cetaceans off the west coast of Canada in 1994. IWC Document SC/47/O 6. 1-7 pp.
 Hail, MA. 1998. An ecological view of the tuna-dolphin problem: impacts and trade-offs. Reviews in Fish Biology and Fisheries. 8: 1-34.
 Kuiken, T, Simpson, VR, Allchin, CR, Bennett, PM, Codd, GA, Harris, EA, Howes, GJ, Kennedy, S, Kirkwood, JK, Law, RJ, Merrett, NR and S Phillips. 1994. Mass mortality of common dolphins (Delphinus delphis) in south west England due to the incidental capture in fishing gear. The Veterinary Record. 134: 81-89.
 Lewison, RL, Crowder, LB, Read, AJ and SA Freeman. 2004. Understanding impacts of fisheries bycatch on marine megafauna. Trends in Ecology & Evolution 19: 598-604.
 Lopez, A, Pierce, GJ, Santos, MB, Gracia, J and A Guerra. 2003. Fishery by-catches of marine mammals in Galician waters: results from on-board observations and an interview survey of fishermen. Biological Conservation. 111: 25-40.
 Morizur, Y, Berrow, SD, Tregenza, NJC, Couperus, AS and S Pouvreau. 1999. Incidental catches of marine mammals in pelagic trawl fisheries of the northeast Atlantic. Fisheries Research. 41: 297-307.
 Wade, PR. 1998. Calculating limits to the allowable human-caused mortality of cetaceans and pinnipeds. Marine Mammal Science. 14: 1-37.
 Zerbini, AN, and JE Kotas. 1998. A note on cetacean bycatch in pelagic driftnetting off southern Brazil. Report of the IWC. 48: 519-524.

External links 

Project GLOBAL: Global Bycatch Assessment of Long-Lived Species project
European Cetacean Bycatch Campaign
Cetacean Bycatch Resource Center
 WWF Species Programme (2004) Cetacean bycatch and the IWC
EIA reports on cetaceans & bycatch: Up to date info.
EIA in the USA: Up to date info.
Sea Anglers Conservation Network press release on cetacean bycatch
Newspaper article describes an ensnared whale who seemingly thanked her rescuers
Scientists rank endangered dolphins and porpoises most in need of immediate action
A WWF Press Release about bycatch
A cetacean bycatch web page by Animal Freedom
New project will tackle whale entanglement, article by Environmental News Service
Learn about sustainable seafood and the Sustainable Seafood Guide

Cetaceans
Environmental impact of fishing